is a railway station operated by the Kominato Railway Company's Kominato Line, located in Ichihara, Chiba Prefecture, Japan. It is 25.7 kilometers from the western terminus of the Kominato Line at Goi Station.

History
Satomi Station was opened on March 7, 1925. Use of its island platform was discontinued on September 16, 1998. It has been unattended since 2002.

Lines
Kominato Railway Company
Kominato Line

Station layout
Satomi Station has a single side platform serving bidirectional traffic. There is a small station building with a waiting room and a ticket office, which is not open.

Platforms

Adjacent stations

External links
  Kominato Railway Company home page

Railway stations in Japan opened in 1925
Railway stations in Chiba Prefecture